The seventh and final season of the American television comedy series Rules of Engagement received a 13-episode order on May 21, 2012, and premiered on Monday, February 4, 2013. On May 10, 2013, CBS cancelled Rules of Engagement, stating that the May 20, 2013 season finale would also be the series finale.

Cast

Main cast
 Patrick Warburton as Jeff Bingham
 Megyn Price as Audrey Bingham
 Oliver Hudson as Adam Rhodes
 Bianca Kajlich as Jennifer Morgan
 David Spade as Russell Dunbar
 Adhir Kalyan as Timmy Patel

Recurring cast
 Wendi McLendon-Covey as Liz
 Sara Rue as Brenda

Episodes

References

2013 American television seasons